Time Stands Still is an album of blues and folk music by American singer/songwriter Chris Smither, released in 2009. It was released on Signature Sound Recordings and produced by David Goodrich.

Reception

Writing for Allmusic, critic Michael G. Nastos praised the album, writing Chris Smither has never sounded better, especially on his lean-sounding guitar. He's more grounded, down to earth, and authentic in his attempt to keep his music very alive and well in troubled times... Of his many great recordings over the years, Time Stands Still might very well be Chris Smither's magnum opus, a triumph over tragedy and tough times that should provide valuable lessons to anyone who has felt abject pain caused by family losses, the grind-to-a-halt recession, unemployment, and that helpless, depressed feeling everyone has experienced. It is uplifting—a recording that you will relate to upon listening to for only a few minutes, but which you will savor all the way through.

Track listing
All songs by Chris Smither unless otherwise noted.
 "Don't Call Me Stranger" - 4:08
 "Time Stands Still" - 3:45
 "Surprise, Surprise" - 4:08
 "I Don't Know" - 4:04
 "Call Yourself" - 4:43
 "Old Man Down"  - 5:00
 "I Told You So" - 3:46
 "It Takes a Lot to Laugh, It Takes a Train to Cry" (Bob Dylan) - 4:26
 "Miner's Blues" (Frank Hutchinson) - 3:08
 "Someone Like Me" - 4:25
 "Madame Geneva's" (Mark Knopfler) - 2:51

Personnel
 Chris Smither – vocals, acoustic guitar
 David Goodrich - electric and acoustic guitar, piano
 Zak Trojano - percussion

Production
 Produced by David Goodrich
 Mixed by Mark Thayer and David Goodrich
 Mastered by Ian Kennedy
 Project coordination by Carol Young
 Design by Meghan Dewar
 Photography by Jeff Fasano

References

2009 albums
Chris Smither albums